{{Infobox settlement
| name                   = 
| image_skyline          = Barcelona Church, Sorsogon.jpg
| image_caption          = Parroquia de San Jose
| image_flag             = Flag_of_Barcelona,_Sorsogon.png
| flag_size              = 120x80px
| image_seal             = Seal_of_Barcelona,_Sorsogon.png
| seal_size              = 100x80px
| image_map              = 
| map_caption            = 
| image_map1             = 
| pushpin_map            = Philippines
| pushpin_label_position = right
| pushpin_map_caption    = Location within the 
| coordinates            = 
| settlement_type        = 
| subdivision_type       = Country
| subdivision_name       = Philippines
| subdivision_type1      = Region
| subdivision_name1      = 
| subdivision_type2      = Province
| subdivision_name2      = 
| official_name          = 
| etymology              =  
| named_for              = Barcelona, Catalonia
| native_name            =
| other_name             =
| nickname               = Catalonia of Asia
| motto                  =
| anthem                 =
| subdivision_type3      = District
| subdivision_name3      = 
| established_title      = Founded
| established_date       = April 16, 1886
| parts_type             = Barangays
| parts_style            = para
| p1                     =   (see Barangays)
| leader_title           =  
| leader_name            = Cynthia G. Falcotelo-Fortes
| leader_title1          = Vice Mayor
| leader_name1           = Maria F. Fortades
| leader_title2          = Representative 
| leader_name2           = Vacant
| leader_title3          = Municipal Council
| leader_name3           = 
| leader_title4          = Electorate 
| leader_name4           =  voters
| government_type        = 
| government_footnotes   = 
| elevation_m            = 
| elevation_max_m        = 126
| elevation_min_m        = 0
| elevation_max_rank     =
| elevation_min_rank     =
| elevation_footnotes    = 
| elevation_max_footnotes= 
| elevation_min_footnotes= 
| area_rank              =
| area_footnotes         = 
| area_total_km2         = 
| population_footnotes   = 
| population_total       = 
| population_as_of       = 
| population_density_km2 = auto
| population_blank1_title= Households
| population_blank1      =  
| population_blank2_title= 
| population_blank2      = 
| population_demonym     =
| population_rank        =
| population_note        =
| timezone               = PST
| utc_offset             = +8
| postal_code_type       = ZIP code
| postal_code            = 
| postal2_code_type      = 
| postal2_code           = 
| area_code_type         = 
| area_code              = 
| website                = 
| demographics_type1     = Economy
| demographics1_title1   = 
| demographics1_info1    = 
| demographics1_title2   = Poverty incidence
| demographics1_info2    = %
| demographics1_title3   = Revenue
| demographics1_info3    =   
| demographics1_title4   = Revenue rank
| demographics1_info4    = 
| demographics1_title5   = Assets
| demographics1_info5    =   
| demographics1_title6   = Assets rank
| demographics1_info6    = 
| demographics1_title7   = IRA
| demographics1_info7    =  
| demographics1_title8   = IRA rank
| demographics1_info8    = 
| demographics1_title9   = Expenditure
| demographics1_info9    =   
| demographics1_title10  = Liabilities
| demographics1_info10   =  
| demographics_type2     = Service provider
| demographics2_title1   = Electricity
| demographics2_info1    = 
| demographics2_title2   = Water
| demographics2_info2    =  
| demographics2_title3   = Telecommunications
| demographics2_info3    = 
| demographics2_title4   = Cable TV
| demographics2_info4    =
| demographics2_title5   = 
| demographics2_info5    =
| demographics2_title6   = 
| demographics2_info6    =
| demographics2_title7   = 
| demographics2_info7    =
| demographics2_title8   = 
| demographics2_info8    =
| demographics2_title9   = 
| demographics2_info9    =
| demographics2_title10  = 
| demographics2_info10   =
| blank_name_sec1        = 
| blank_info_sec1        = 
| blank1_name_sec1       = Native languages
| blank1_info_sec1       = 
| blank2_name_sec1       = Crime index
| blank2_info_sec1       = 
| blank3_name_sec1       = 
| blank3_info_sec1       = 
| blank4_name_sec1       = 
| blank4_info_sec1       = 
| blank5_name_sec1       = 
| blank5_info_sec1       = 
| blank6_name_sec1       = 
| blank6_info_sec1       = 
| blank7_name_sec1       = 
| blank7_info_sec1       = 
| blank1_name_sec2       = Major religions
| blank1_info_sec2       = 
| blank2_name_sec2       = Feast date
| blank2_info_sec2       = 
| blank3_name_sec2       = Catholic diocese
| blank3_info_sec2       =
| blank4_name_sec2       = Patron saint 
| blank4_info_sec2       = 
| blank5_name_sec2       = 
| blank5_info_sec2       = 
| blank6_name_sec2       = 
| blank6_info_sec2       = 
| blank7_name_sec2       = 
| blank7_info_sec2       =
| short_description      =
| footnotes              =
}}

Barcelona, officially the Municipality of Barcelona (Waray Sorsogon: Bungto san Barcelona'';), is a 5th class municipality in the province of Sorsogon, Philippines. According to the 2020 census, it has a population of 20,987 people.

It is bounded by Gubat in the north, Bulusan in the south, Casiguran in the west and Philippine Sea in the east.

History 
The site of Barcelona was originally part of Gubat and Bulusan. The town's name was known as Danlog, taken from the name of a local river. The change of name to Barcelona was recommended by a Spanish official who saw some similarities with Barcelona, Catalonia (Spain). On April 16, 1886, it became a pueblo civil.  Until 1868, it was part of the parish of St. James the Great of Bulusan.  After 1868, it took St. Joseph as its patron saint and celebrates their town fiesta on May 19.

For most of the Fourth and Fifth Republics, it was governed by Mayors Rustico Estopace and Salvador Estuye. Barcelona is best known for its abundant supply of coconuts, copra, and root crops such as sweet potato & cassava.

Geography

Barangays
Barcelona is politically subdivided into 25 barangays. In 1957, the name of barrio Paghabulan was changed to Peña Francia.

Climate

Demographics

Economy

References

External links

 
 Barcelona Profile at PhilAtlas.com
 [ Philippine Standard Geographic Code]
 Philippine Census Information
 Local Governance Performance Management System

Municipalities of Sorsogon